Daniel Swern (January 21, 1916 – December 5, 1982) was an American chemist who discovered the Swern oxidation.

References

1916 births
1982 deaths
20th-century American chemists